Levi Casboult (born 15 March 1990) is an Australian rules footballer, who currently plays for the Gold Coast Suns in the Australian Football League, having formerly played for the Carlton Football Club from 2010 to 2021.

Casboult, a tall and solidly built player, spent much of his formative years as a ruckman and key position player. Casboult began to play TAC Cup football with the Dandenong Stingrays in 2007. He played a total of 44 games with the Stingrays; in his first two seasons, he scored only three goals, but in 2009 he was moved into a key forward role and scored 41 goals in 20 matches.

Casboult was recruited by the Carlton Football Club with its third round selection in the 2010 AFL Rookie Draft (at selection 44 overall). His first month at the club was eventful. Before the 2009 Christmas break, Casboult attended the team's controversial booze cruise (the fallout from which included the suspensions of Andrew Walker, Eddie Betts and Ryan Houlihan, plus a "please explain" to the club from the AFL); it was widely reported in the media that, in an initiation game, Casboult was handcuffed to an unnamed senior player and forced to match him drink-for-drink until barely conscious. A few days later, on 24 December, Casboult was fortunate to walk away uninjured from in a head-on car accident: his car was struck by the car of Samir Azemi, which had jumped the median strip on the Princes Highway in Dandenong. Azemi was killed in the accident.

Playing as a key forward and occasional ruckman for the club's , the Northern Blues, Casboult did not play an AFL game for Carlton in his first two seasons after being drafted, and was even on occasion dropped to the VFL reserves. A PCL injury at the start of 2012 made his chances of ever making his senior debut seem unlikely; but, only two VFL games after his return from that injury, Casboult was called into the senior team for his debut as starting ruckman in Round 17, 2012, after injuries and suspension resulted in Carlton's first three ruck choices all being unavailable for selection.

Casboult won a regular place in the senior team in 2014, playing as a forward and sometimes as a back-up ruckman. Over the course of his career, he gained attention as one of the strongest contested marks in the competition. and he was a Mark of the Year finalist in 2014. Through the early part of his career, this strength in his game was offset by very poor goalkicking accuracy from set shots, returning less than 50% each season and not reliable even at close range; but after working with former Collingwood and North Melbourne full forward Saverio Rocca in 2015 and again in 2017, became one of the team's most reliable set shots. He led the team in goalkicking for the only time in his career in 2017, with a return of 34 goals, 18 behinds, and signed a two-year contract extension with the club after the season.

After a 2018 season was abbreviated by injury, Casboult returned as a regular to the team in 2019 and 2020, and began playing swing key position roles in both the forwardline and backline, as well as back-up ruck. Falling out of form in 2021, Casboult played about half of the season in the senior team and was delisted at the end of the year, after 154 senior games.

Statistics
Statistics are correct to the end of round 23, 2022

|-
|- style="background-color: #EAEAEA"
! scope="row" style="text-align:center" | 2012
|style="text-align:center;"|
| 41 || 6 || 7 || 12 || 37 || 17 || 54 || 31 || 12 || 43 || 1.2 || 2.0 || 6.2 || 2.8 || 9.0 || 5.2 || 2.0 || 9.0 || 0
|-
! scope="row" style="text-align:center" | 2013
|style="text-align:center;"|
| 41 || 11 || 7 || 7 || 63 || 37 || 100 || 48 || 18 || 68 || 0.6 || 0.6 || 5.7 || 3.4 || 9.1 || 4.3 || 1.6 || 6.2 || 0
|- style="background-color: #EAEAEA"
! scope="row" style="text-align:center" | 2014
|style="text-align:center;"|
| 41 || 19 || 15 || 11 || 109 || 91 || 200 || 108 || 43 || 131 || 0.8 || 0.6 || 5.7 || 4.8 || 10.5 || 5.7 || 2.3 || 6.9 || 0
|-
! scope="row" style="text-align:center" | 2015
|style="text-align:center;"|
| 41 || 16 || 24 || 12 || 100 || 50 || 150 || 83 || 15 || 86 || 1.5 || 0.8 || 6.3 || 3.1 || 9.4 || 5.2 || 0.9 || 5.4 || 0
|- style="background-color: #EAEAEA"
! scope="row" style="text-align:center" | 2016
|style="text-align:center;"|
| 41 || 20 || 18 || 18 || 119 || 72 || 191 || 107 || 26 || 6 || 0.9 || 0.9 || 6.0 || 3.6 || 9.6 || 5.4 || 1.3 || 0.3 || 0
|-
! scope="row" style="text-align:center" | 2017
|style="text-align:center;"|
| 41 || 22 || 34 || 18 || 144 || 76 || 220 || 120 || 39 || 157 || 1.5 || 0.8|| 6.5 || 3.4 || 10 || 5.4|| 1.8 || 7.1 || 0
|- style="background-color: #EAEAEA"
! scope="row" style="text-align:center" | 2018
|style="text-align:center;"|
| 41 || 10 || 12 || 10 || 61 || 25 || 86 || 37 || 12 || 76 || 1.2 || 1.0|| 6.1 || 2.5 || 8.6 || 3.7|| 1.2 || 7.6 || 0
|-
! scope="row" style="text-align:center" | 2019
|style="text-align:center;"|
| 41 || 20 || 15 || 11 || 159 || 64 || 223 || 114 || 44 || 164 || 0.8 || 0.6 || 8.0 || 3.2 || 11.2 || 5.7 || 2.2 || 8.2 || 0
|- style="background-color: #EAEAEA"
! scope="row" style="text-align:center" | 2020
|style="text-align:center;"|
| 41 || 17 || 16 || 8 || 112 || 40 || 152 || 80 || 31 || 86 || 0.9 || 0.5 || 6.6 || 2.4 || 8.9 || 4.7 || 1.8 || 5.1 || 2
|-
! scope="row" style="text-align:center" | 2021
|style="text-align:center;"|
| 41 || 13 || 8 || 5 || 77 || 34 || 111 || 47 || 25 || 79 || 0.6 || 0.4 || 5.9 || 2.6 || 8.5 || 3.6 || 1.9 || 6.1 || 0
|- style="background-color: #EAEAEA"
! scope="row" style="text-align:center" | 2022
|style="text-align:center;"|
| 30 || 21 || 35 || 22 || 114 || 7 || 31 || 17 || 1 || 0 || 2.3 || 0.7 || 8.0 || 2.3 || 10.3 || 5.7 || 0.3 || 0.0 || TBA
|- style="background-color: #EAEAEA"
! colspan=3| Career
! 176
! 163
! 114
! 1094
! 513
! 1518
! 792
! 266
! 896
! 1.0
! 0.7
! 6.4
! 3.3
! 9.7
! 5.0
! 1.7
! 5.7
! 2
|}

Notes

References

External links

Australian rules footballers from Victoria (Australia)
Carlton Football Club players
Preston Football Club (VFA) players
1990 births
Living people
Dandenong Stingrays players
Gold Coast Football Club players
Australian rules footballers from Hobart